The 1990 Missouri Valley Conference men's basketball tournament was played after the conclusion of the 1989–1990 regular season at Redbird Arena on the campus of Illinois State University in Normal, Illinois.

It was also the final MVC tournament played on a campus site, before moving the entire event to St. Louis the following season.

Bracket

References

1989–90 Missouri Valley Conference men's basketball season
Missouri Valley Conference men's basketball tournament
Missouri Valley Conference men's basketball tournament